Līvāni Municipality is a municipality in Latgale, Latvia. The municipality was formed in 1999 by merging Rožupe Parish, Turki Parish and Līvāni town. In 2009 it absorbed Jersika Parish, Rudzāti Parish and Sutri Parish, too the administrative centre being Līvāni.

Images

See also 
 Administrative divisions of Latvia (2009)

References 

 
Municipalities of Latvia
Latgale